The Divizia A1 is the men's top Romanian professional volleyball league.

Past winners

See also
 Romanian Women's Volleyball League

External links 
 Romanian Volleyball Federation
 Primul portal din voleiul românesc First portal of Romanian volleyball

References 

 
Volleyball in Romania
Romania
Sports leagues established in 1949
Professional sports leagues in Romania